Jens Meiler (born August 31, 1974) is a German-American biologist and structural chemist. He currently serves as a Professor of Chemistry and Associate Professor of Pharmacology and Biomedical Informatics at Vanderbilt University. His research focuses on protein structures and computational biology, drawing on interdisciplinary techniques from other sciences.

Biography
Meiler was born in Germany. He attended the University of Leipzig, where he received a B.S. in biology in 1995. He then continued onto the University of Frankfurt receiving a Ph.D. in structural biology in 2001, where he was funded by the German National Merit Foundation scholarship. His doctoral adviser was Christian Griesinger, Director of the Max Planck Institute for Biophysical Chemistry. Meiler then completed his post-doctoral work in the same field through the Human Frontier Science Program at the University of Washington from 2001 to 2004. His postdoctoral adviser was David Baker (biochemist), the Henrietta and Aubrey Davis Endowed Professor in Biochemistry, University of Washington.

After completing a postdoctoral fellowship, Meiler served as an Assistant Professor of Chemistry, Pharmacology, and Biomedical Informatics at Vanderbilt University. In 2011, he received tenure and was promoted to Associate Professor. During this time, he received the Vanderbilt Institute for Chemical Biology Prize for Highly Cited Article award (2014).

In 2019, Meiler was awarded the Alexander von Humboldt Professorship from the Alexander von Humboldt Foundation his research in bioinformatics and protein structures. As part of the award, Meiler collaborated with colleagues at Leipzig University on the study of G-protein coupled receptors. He was also named the Stevenson Chair in Chemistry. At Vanderbilt, his lab conducts research on cheminformatics, Ligand docking, and protein design. It is funded by a number of national organizations, including the National Science Foundation and the National Institutes of Health.

The Meiler Lab at Vanderbilt University specializes in computational, structural, and chemical biology. Their focus is on protein-protein interactions, protein design, ligand docking, and cheminformatics. Their findings on small-molecule therapeutics and receptor-binding proteins have been published in academic journals like Nature. In recent years, Meiler has also conducted research on artificial intelligence. His work has been featured in newspapers in both the United States and Germany.

Honors and awards
 2019  Alexander von Humboldt Professorship from the Alexander von Humboldt Foundation
 2015	Vanderbilt University Chancellor Faculty Fellow
 2014	Vanderbilt Institute for Chemical Biology Prize for Highly Cited Article
 2002–2005	Human Frontier Science Program postdoctoral fellowship
 1998–2001	Kekulé Scholarship, German Chemical Industry Association
 1994–1998	German National Merit Foundation scholarship

Personal life
Jens Meiler lives in Nashville, Tennessee and Leipzig, Germany.

Notable publications

References

External links
 

1974 births
Living people
21st-century American chemists
21st-century German chemists
Structural biologists